Ajman (Gulf Arabic: عيمان ʿymān) is the capital of the emirate of Ajman in the United Arab Emirates. It is the fifth-largest city in UAE after Dubai, Abu Dhabi, Sharjah and Al Ain. Located along the Persian Gulf, it is engulfed by the larger emirate of Sharjah in territory.

History 
Al Bu Kharaiban Nuaimi rule in Ajman started in 1816, when Sheikh Rashid bin Humaid Al Nuaimi and fifty of his followers took the coastal settlement of Ajman from members of the Al Bu Shamis Nuaimi tribe in a short conflict. It wasn't until 1816 or 1817, however, that the Ajman fort finally fell to Rashid's followers and his rule was endorsed by the powerful Sheikh of neighbouring Sharjah and Ras Al Khaimah, Sheikh Sultan bin Saqr Al Qasimi.

On 8 January 1820, following the sack of Ras Al Khaimah by a British force led by Sir W.G. Keir, Sultan bin Saqr signed the General Maritime Treaty with the United Kingdom on 4 February 1820, followed on 15 March by Rashid bin Humaid at Falaya Fort.

An 1822 British maritime survey noted that Ajman had one of the best backwaters on the coast and was a small town with a single fortified building, the ruler's house. In common with many other coastal towns on what became the Trucial Coast, the population was mobile depending on the season – there were as many as 1,400 to 1,700 men of the 'Mahamee' tribe living there during the pearl hunting season (April–September), many of whom would migrate to Al Buraimi in the date season. The survey notes that Ajman's ruler Rashid bin Ahmed considered his dominion independent of the Emirate of Sharjah, but that Sharjah did not maintain that view even though it had no power over Ajman. The survey noted that the inhabitants of Ajman were 'mostly strict Wahhabis' and recorded the presence of the ruined village of Fasht down the shore from Ajman town, which is today the Fisht suburb of Sharjah city.

In 1831, the Sheikh of Ajman accepted a subsidy from the Imam of Muscat to join with Sultan bin Saqr of Sharjah against Sohar, but following Sultan's defeat declared for Sohar. In his absence, a part of Bani Yas from Abu Dhabi sacked Ajman town and its date groves. In retaliation, the forces of Ajman committed 'daring depredations' upon the cities of Sohar and Muscat. When called upon to provide redress for the actions of his 'subject', Sultan bin Saqr disavowed any authority over Ajman and in 1832 a British naval force was sent to Ajman to obtain redress for the raids on the East Coast cities. Ending a conflict between Sharjah, Ajman and Dubai on the one hand and Abu Dhabi on the other, Ajman (together with the other parties) signed the 1835 Maritime Treaty in its own right.

In 1840, Humaid bin Obeid bin Subt of Al Heera invaded Ajman supported by a body of the Bani Naeem. Although initially reluctant to assist Humeid bin Rashid, Sultan bin Suggur of Sharjah sent his son Suggur who, together with Maktoum of Dubai, ejected the invaders and sacked Al Heera in reprisal.

In 1843 a further Maritime Treaty was signed between the Trucial Sheikhs and the British and then, on 4 May 1853, 'A Perpetual Treaty of Peace' was entered into by the coastal Sheikhs, including Ajman. A copy of this treaty is on display in Ajman Museum. A further treaty of 1892 bound the Trucial States to Britain.

By the 20th century, J. G. Lorimer's survey of the coast of the Trucial States showed Ajman to be a small town of some 750 inhabitants (in comparison, the population of Dubai at the time numbered over 10,000). On 2 December 1971, Ajman, under Sheikh Rashid bin Humayd Al Nuaimi, joined the United Arab Emirates.

Population
The city has more than 90% of the population of the emirate. The area runs directly into the city of Sharjah along the coast to the southwest, which in turn is adjacent to Dubai, forming a continuous urban area.

Commercial
Ajman is home to the Ruler's office, companies, commercial markets, and about 50 international and local retail shops. Banking interests include: Emirates NBD, Ajman Bank, Arab Bank PLC, Bank Saderat Iran, and Commercial Bank of Dubai. Ajman is also home to fishing industry & Seafood Importers/Exporters in UAE. Shopping malls include Ajman China Mall and City Centre Ajman.

Ajman Free Zone

With the capacity to accommodate 1500 companies and serving over 1,000 vessels a year, Ajman Port and Ajman Free Zone are major contributors to the emirate's economy. Exporting to over 65 countries, the Free Zone's companies make up approximately 20% of the UAE's overall industrial units, with some 256 industrial companies operating from the zone.

Tourism

Ajman is continuing the development stalled by the financial crisis of 2007–2008 and once again undergoing a period of growth. It has immensely grown throughout the years, with recent investments from foreign companies and installations and renovations of its tourist attractions, hotels and commercial sites. Tourist attractions in the emirate are growing rapidly. They include the Ajman Beach, Ajman National Museum situated at Ajman Fort, the Red Fort and the museum in the inland enclave of Manama. City Centre Ajman, the Emirate’s biggest mall, is a big attraction as well for its unique architectural experience and variety of shops and confectionaries.

Ajman's corniche is a popular evening and weekend destination for families and features a number of fast food outlets, coffee shops and stalls. It is home to the 'Outside Inn', a popular watering hole with expatriates, as well as to a number of hotels, including the Ramada, Ajman Palace, Ajman Hotel, the Ajman Saray and Fairmont Ajman.

Ajman's newly developed Al Zorah area supports a range of outdoor activities, including golf, children's play areas and kayaking.

Transportation
The natural port (or khor) of Ajman is located along a natural creek which penetrates the town. Ajman is also home to Arab Heavy Industries, one of the world's largest ship manufacturing firms.

For international air travel, residents of Ajman can also use the Sharjah International Airport, which is only a few kilometres away.

Universities and colleges
 Ajman University, founded in 1988 
 City University College of Ajman (CUCA) 
 Gulf Medical University

Notable people

Kulthum Bin Masoud (born 1957), Emirati journalist, writer, poet and businesswoman
Khalfan Mubarak (born 1995), Emirati football player

Ajman Stud

Ajman Stud is a Horse Stud Farm established in 2002 by the Crown Prince of the Emirate of Ajman H.H. Ammar bin Humaid Al Nuaimi. It is 30 Kms from the main city of Ajman. "Colt Gold" title won by  Gallardo J in 2016 where H.H Ammar bin Humaid Al Nuaimi was crowned as best breeder and owner.

See also

References

Cities in the United Arab Emirates
Populated coastal places in the United Arab Emirates
Populated places in the Emirate of Ajman